Egon Jux (17 July 1927 in Königsberg – 19 August 2008) was a German architect.

He is best known for road bridge design, including the Grand Duchess Charlotte Bridge in Luxembourg, and the Köhlbrandbrücke, Hamburg.

Jux was a student of the Swiss architect Le Corbusier.

References
 

1927 births
2008 deaths
Modernist architects
20th-century German architects
21st-century German architects